The Comana Natural Park is a protected area (natural park category V IUCN) situated in Romania, in the administrative territory of Giurgiu County.

The park is roughly a 45-minute drive from the Romanian capital of Bucharest.  The park was established in 2004 and has recreational activities such as kayaking,

See also 
 Protected areas of Romania

References 

Protected areas of Romania
Geography of Giurgiu County
Protected areas established in 2005
Tourist attractions in Giurgiu County
Ramsar sites in Romania